Fikret Güler (born May 6, 1953, Turkey) is a Taekwon-Do Senior Master, 8th degree black belt. He was one of the main developers of the martial art in Scandinavia, mainly in Finland. Through his Taekwon-Do career he was affiliated to the International Taekwon-Do Federation all the way. For many years, he was the coach of the Finnish National Taekwon-Do Team, leading the team to gain great international success in competitions, tradition, that still goes on. He is influential at the organizational level both nationally and internationally. He is the President of the Turkish National Governing Body of International Taekwon-Do Federation SM Güler now resides in Turkey.

References

Turkish martial artists
Living people
1953 births